The 1970 United States Senate election in North Dakota was held November 3, 1970. The incumbent, North Dakota Democratic NPL Party Senator Quentin Burdick, was re-elected to his third term, defeating Republican candidate Thomas S. Kleppe, who later became the United States Secretary of the Interior.

Only Burdick filed as a Dem-NPLer, and the endorsed Republican candidate was Thomas S. Kleppe, who was finishing his second and final term as a Representative for North Dakota's second congressional district. Burdick and Kleppe won the primary elections for their respective parties.

One independent candidate, Russell Kleppe, also filed before the deadline.

Election results

See also 
 United States Senate elections, 1970

Notes

External links
1970 North Dakota U.S. Senate Election results

North Dakota
1970
1970 North Dakota elections